Hilltown may refer to:

 Hill town, a town built upon hills to make invasion difficult
 Hilltown, Nova Scotia, Canada
 Hilltown, County Down, Northern Ireland
 Hilltown, County Westmeath, St. Feighin's, barony of Fore, County Westmeath, Ireland
 Hilltown, Dundee, Scotland
 Hilltown, South Australia

United States
 Hilltown, the former name of Helltown, California
 Hilltown, Indiana
 Hilltown Township, Bucks County, Pennsylvania
 Hilltown, Pennsylvania
 Hilltown, Virginia

See also
 Hilltowns in Central Italy
 Hiltown, Lower Saxony, Germany
 Hilltowns, of Western Massachusetts, United States
 Hill Town, the former name of Old Hilltown, California
 Hill Township (disambiguation)
 Town Hill (disambiguation)
 Townhill (disambiguation)